Cvrčovice may refer to places in the Czech Republic:

Cvrčovice (Brno-Country District), a municipality and village in the South Moravian Region
Cvrčovice (Kladno District), a municipality and village in the Central Bohemian Region